Mardin Province is a province in Turkey with a population of 862,757 in 2021. The largest city in the province is Kızıltepe, while the capital Mardin is the second largest city with a population of 129,864.

Districts 

Mardin province is divided into 10 districts (capital district in bold):
 Artuklu District
 Dargeçit District
 Derik District
 Kızıltepe District
 Mazıdağı District
 Midyat District
 Nusaybin District
 Ömerli District
 Savur District
 Yeşilli District

Demographics 
Mardin Province is a linguistically, ethnically and religiously diverse province. The dominant ethnic groups are Arabs, Assyrians and Kurds of which Kurds constitute a majority. Other minor groups include Armenians, Chechens and Turks, while Jews lived in the area before migrating to Israel around 1948. The Chechens settled in the region during the Russo-Turkish War in 1877/1878.

The distinctive Mhallami community also reside in the district.

The province is considered part of Turkish Kurdistan. In 1990, it was estimated that Kurds constituted 75% of the population.

Social relations 
Social relations between Arabs and Kurds have historically been difficult with hostility, prejudice and stereotypes but have in recent years improved. Arabs with Assyrians did not take part in the Kurdish–Turkish conflict and the position of the two groups have been described as being 'submissive' to the Turkish state, creating distrust between them and the Kurds. Kurds perceived Arabs as spies for the state and local Arabs in Mardin city tended to exclude and dominate local politics in the city. Arabs started losing their grip on Mardin city in the 2010s and the Kurdish BDP won the city in the local elections in 2014. Mardin city had previously been governed by pro-state parties supported by local Arabs.

Despite the difficult relations, Arab families have since the 1980s joined the Kurdish cause, and Arab and Assyrian politicians from Mardin are found in Peoples' Democratic Party including Mithat Sancar and Februniye Akyol.

Language 

A 2018 estimate put the Kurdish language at 70%, Arabic at 30% and Syriac at 1%.

Religion 
In the Ottoman yearbook of 1894–1895, Mardin Sanjak had a population of 34,361 and  adhered to Islam. The Jewish population declined to 72 individuals from 490 in 1927.

It was estimated that 25,000 Assyrian members of the Syriac Orthodox Church still lived in the province in 1979. Only 4,000 Assyrians remained in the province in 2020, most having migrated to Europe or Istanbul since the 1980s.

Economy 
In Mardin agriculture is an important branch accounting for 70% of the provinces income. Bulgur, lentils or wheat and other grains are produced. In the capital, there are many civil servants, mostly Turks. Close markets for foreign trade are Syria and Iraq.

History
The first known civilization were the Subarian-Hurrians who were then succeeded in 3000 BCE by the Hurrians. The Elamites gained control around 2230 BCE and were followed by the Babylonians, Hittites, Assyrians, Romans and Byzantines.

The local Assyrians/Syriacs, while reduced due to the Assyrian genocide and Kurdish-Turkish conflict, hold on to two of the oldest monasteries in the world, Dayro d-Mor Hananyo (Turkish Deyrülzafaran, English Saffron Monastery) and Deyrulumur Monastery. The Christian community is concentrated on the Tur Abdin plateau and in the town of Midyat, with a smaller community (approximately 200) in the provincial capital. After the foundation of Turkey, the province has been a target of a Turkification policy, removing most traces of a non-turkish heritage.

Inspectorate General 
In 1927 the office of the Inspector general was created, which governed with martial law. The province was included in the First Inspectorate-General over which the Inspector General ruled. The Inspectorate-General span over the provinces of Hakkâri, Siirt, Van, Mardin, Bitlis, Sanlıurfa, Elaziğ and Diyarbakır. The Inspectorate General were dissolved in 1952 during the Government of the Democrat Party. The Mardin province was also included in a wider military zone in 1928, in which the entrance to the zone was forbidden for foreigners until 1965.

State of Emergency 
In 1987 the province was included in the OHAL region governed in a state of emergency. In November 1996 the state of emergency regulation was removed.

Largest cities

Gallery

Bibliography

References

External links 

 Mardin Weather Forecast Information
  Pictures of the capital of this province
 Articles about the Syriacs and photos of Midyat
 Mardin photos
 Tourism information is available in English at the Southeastern Anatolian Promotion Project site.
 Mardin Travel Guide
 https://twitter.com/MardinBuyukshr

 
Provinces of Turkey
Upper Mesopotamia
Assyrian geography
Geography of Kurdistan
Turkish Kurdistan